Pea Ridge School District 109  is a school district based in Pea Ridge, Benton County, Arkansas. The district is accredited by the Arkansas Department of Education (ADE) and AdvancED.

The district includes the majority of Pea Ridge, half of Gateway, sections of Garfield, and very small portions of Bella Vista and Little Flock.

Schools 
 Pea Ridge High School (9–12)
 Pea Ridge Middle School (6–8)
 Pea Ridge Intermediate School (3–5)
 Pea Ridge Primary School (KG–2)
 Pea Ridge Academy (alternative learning environment)

References

External links
 

School districts in Arkansas
Education in Benton County, Arkansas